Hylaeus mesillae is a species of hymenopteran in the family Colletidae. It is found in Central America and North America.

Subspecies
These three subspecies belong to the species Hylaeus mesillae:
 Hylaeus mesillae cressoni (Cockerell, 1907)
 Hylaeus mesillae cressonii Cockerell, 1907
 Hylaeus mesillae mesillae (Cockerell, 1896)

References

Further reading

 

Colletidae
Articles created by Qbugbot
Insects described in 1896